Pleurobema chattanoogaense, the painted clubshell, is a species of freshwater mussel, an aquatic bivalve mollusk in the family Unionidae, the river mussels.

This species is endemic to the United States.  Its natural habitat is rivers.

References

Molluscs of the United States
chattanoogaense
Bivalves described in 1858
Taxonomy articles created by Polbot